Operation Stonewall was a World War II operation to intercept blockade runners off the west coast of German-occupied France. It was an effective example of inter-service and international co-operation.

Background
From the start of the war, the Allies had maintained a blockade against the import of seaborne goods to Germany. Although rich in many basic industrial materials, Germany, like Britain, could not indigenously produce some essentials. These included rubber, tin, and tungsten.

Until Germany invaded the Soviet Union it evaded the blockade via the Trans-Siberian Railway. Large quantities of materials were shipped by this route. After this was closed, German and Italian ships, stranded in Japan and Japanese-occupied Singapore, were used as blockade runners to bring in these essential goods to ports in occupied France

Although organised interdiction against these blockade runners was not set up until December 1943, the Allies intercepted and sank several ships in the Atlantic and Indian Oceans. Few ships managed successful runs. A lot did not.

The operation

The Royal New Zealand Navy light cruiser HMNZS Gambia joined the operation in December 1943, operating from Horta in the Azores. The Royal Navy light cruiser  patrolled an area north of the islands.

On 23 December aircraft from the United States Navy escort carrier  sighted a suspected runner, and there were further reports of a flotilla of destroyers escorting another merchantman west from France. Gambia,  Glasgow, and the light cruiser  formed a cordon to intercept.

The light cruiser , minelayer  and four Free French destroyers joined the patrol to intercept another runner. RAF Coastal Command aircraft acted in close cooperation.

On 27 December at 1535 hrs Liberator GR Mk V heavy bomber of Coastal Command's Czechoslovak-crewed No. 311 Squadron RAF sighted a smaller blockade runner, the  refrigerated cargo ship . The Liberator made a diving attack with eight wing-mounted SAP60 semi-armour piercing rocket projectiles, five of which hit the cargo ship above her waterline. The Liberator also dropped one  bomb, and one 250 lb (115 kg) bomb one of which hit the ship aft of her funnel. The ship immediately caught fire.

Alsterufer defended herself with anti-aircraft fire and rockets that released parachute cables. The Liberator's starboard outer engine was hit, but the aircraft successfully returned to base at RAF Beaulieu in England. Later that day two more RAF Liberators and four RAF Halifax heavy bombers attacked the ship, but claimed no hits. Alsterufer sank on the afternoon of 28 December. 74 members of her crew were rescued by four Canadian corvettes.

Kriegsmarine destroyers and torpedo boats had set out to meet and escort Alsterufer in an operation codenamed Bernau. Now Glasgow and Enterprise sought to intercept them. Guided by shadowing aircraft, the cruisers intercepted eight destroyers early in the afternoon of 28 December and exchanged fire with them. Despite accurate German gunfire and torpedoes, effective German evading action and an attack with guided bombs by a Luftwaffe aircraft, the Royal Navy ships maintained contact.

Battle of the Bay of Biscay

The German ships divided into two groups and the cruisers pursued one of these. By 1600 hrs the s T25 and T26 and the  Z27 had been sunk and one had escaped, damaged. About 62 survivors were rescued by Royal Navy minesweepers, 168 by a  Irish coaster, and four by Spanish destroyers. The blockade runner Osorno reached the Gironde but struck a wreck in the estuary. She was beached and subsequently unloaded offshore.

Glasgow, Enterprise and Ariadne returned to Plymouth and Penelope to Gibraltar. More blockade runners from the Far East were expected, so the Gambia and the light cruiser  patrolled north of the Azores for the next three days. Gambia then returned to Plymouth on 1 January 1944.

Three more German ships were sunk between 3 and 5 January by US Navy patrols in the South Atlantic. These were the last German blockade runners.

By Autumn, German armies were retreating out of France and the French ports were no longer open to Axis ships.

Allied participants
Ships: Canadian, French, New Zealand, United Kingdom, United States
Aircraft: United Kingdom (including one with Czechoslovak crew), United States

Notes

References
 
 
 
 
 
 
 https://fcafa.com/2013/12/27/70th-anniversary-of-the-alsterufer-sinking/

Battles and operations of World War II involving Czechoslovakia
Naval aviation operations and battles
Naval battles of World War II involving Canada
Naval battles of World War II involving France
Naval battles of World War II involving Germany
Naval battles of World War II involving New Zealand
Naval battles and operations of World War II involving the United Kingdom